Cravat, cravate or cravats may refer to:
 Cravat (early), forerunner neckband of the modern necktie
 Cravat, British name for what in American English is called an ascot tie
 Cravat bandage, a triangular bandage
 Cravat (horse) (1935–1954), an American Thoroughbred racehorse
 Cravat Regiment, a guard of honour in Croatia
 Croats (military unit), 17th-century light cavalry forces also known as Cravats
 La Cravate, 1957 French short film also known as Les têtes interverties
 Nick Cravat, stage name of American actor and stunt performer Nicholas Cuccia (1912–1994)
 The Cravats, an English punk rock band formed in 1977
 Yancey and Sabra Cravat, protagonists of the Edna Ferber novel Cimarron and its two film adaptations

See also
 Cravath, surname